Nelson Guarda (26 November 1933 – 31 January 2002) was a Brazilian rower. He competed in the men's coxed four event at the 1956 Summer Olympics.

References

External links
 

1933 births
2002 deaths
Brazilian male rowers
Olympic rowers of Brazil
Rowers at the 1956 Summer Olympics
Sportspeople from Rio Grande do Sul
Pan American Games medalists in rowing
Pan American Games bronze medalists for Brazil
Rowers at the 1959 Pan American Games